Superfast is a studio album by the rock band Dynamite Hack, released in 2000.

The album peaked at No. 84 on the Billboard 200.

Production
The album was produced by David Eaton. A remixed version of the "Boyz-N-The-Hood" cover appears on the album, after Dr. Dre asked the band to remove certain words.

Critical reception
The Austin Chronicle called the album "supersheeny corporate punk." The Los Angeles Times wrote: "Call ‘em Blink-91—a cut-rate, half-price take on Blink-182’s melodic power-punk, minus the puerile wit and deceptively smart commentary (in other words, the character)." Texas Monthly deemed the album "the smartest power pop to break out of Texas in years." Style Weekly wrote that "bubble-gum punk, pseudo-rap, and watered-down 'alternative' rock are all present." The Morning Call considered it "slightly above-average pop-punk that plays with dynamics more than usual, though not enough to transcend the overdone and tired genre."

The Village Voice chose the band's cover of "Boyz-N-The-Hood" as the 46th worst song of the 2000s.

Track listing
All songs written by Dynamite Hack, except where noted.
1. "Switcheroo" 3:12
2. "Anyway" 2:33
3. "Alvin" 2:41
4. "Dear Kate," 2:51
5. "G-Force" 3:00
6. "Wussypuff" 3:02
7. "Blue Sky" 3:46
8. "Slice Of Heaven" 2:42
9. "Granola" 2:04
10. "Boyz-N-The-Hood" 3:04 (Lyrics: Andre Young, Eric Wright, O'Shea Jackson; Music: Dynamite Hack)
11. "Pick Up Lines" 3:12
12. "Marie..." 2:44
13. "Just Another Day, Baby" 0:25
14. "Laughter" 2:16
15. "Anyway (Mellow Version)" 4:00

"Boyz-N-The-Hood" is a cover, originally performed by N.W.A.

Personnel

Dynamite Hack
Mark Morris - Guitar, Piano, Vocals
Mike Vlahakis: Guitars
Chad Robinson: Bass, Vocals
Chase Texas: Drums, Percussion

Additional Personnel
Willy Paisano: Keyboards on "Blue Sky"
William Snell: Slide Guitar on "Marie..."
Emily Kate: Additional Vocal on "Anyway (Piano Version)"
Christophe "Robitussin": Drums on "Blue Sky" and "Slice of Heaven"
Jon Dishongh: Additional keyboards and electronic beats/sequencing

Production
Arranged by Dynamite Hack and David Eaton
Produced and recorded by David Eaton, with recording assistance (at Fire Station) by Bobby Arnold
Tracks 1-9 and 11-15 mixed at Quad Studios and Pedernales Studios by Chris Shaw (assistance at Quad Studios by Gabriel Martinez); track 10 mixed by David Eaton
Mastered by Howie Weinberg
All songs published by Choosy Mothers Music/Pie Mikey Pie Music/Wussypuff Music/Happysmallchild Music, except track ten (lyrics published by Ruthless Attack Music; music published by Choosy Mothers Music/Pie Mikey Pie Music/Wussypuff Music/Happysmallchild Music)

Singles
"Boyz-N-The Hood", released in March/April 2000 as the first single.

References

2000 debut albums
Dynamite Hack albums